Shinobu Asagoe and Els Callens were the defending champions but they competed with different partners that year, Asagoe with Nana Miyagi and Callens with Meilen Tu.

Asagoe and Miyagi lost in the quarterfinals to Rika Fujiwara and Roberta Vinci.

Callens and Tu won in the final 7–5, 6–4 against Alicia Molik and Martina Navratilova.

Seeds
Text in italics indicates the round in which those seeds were eliminated.

Draw

Main draw

Qualifying draw

References
 2003 DFS Classic Draws
 ITF Tournament Page
 ITF doubles results page
 ITF doubles qualifying results page

DFS Classic - Doubles
Doubles